John Gottlieb Karst (October 15, 1893 in Philadelphia – May 21, 1976 in Cape May Court House, New Jersey), was a professional baseball player who played third base in one game for the 1915 Brooklyn Robins. He attended the University of Pennsylvania.

External links

1893 births
1976 deaths
Major League Baseball third basemen
Brooklyn Robins players
Baseball players from Pennsylvania